In chemistry, an oxycation is a polyatomic ion with a positive charge that contains oxygen.

Examples
 Dioxygenyl ion, 
 Nitrosonium ion,
 Nitronium ion, 
 Vanadyl ion, VO2+, a very stable oxycation
 Uranyl ion, all natural U6+ occurs in this form
 Zirconyl ion, as a tetramer of [Zr(OH)2]2+

See category for a bigger list.

See also
Oxyanion
 List of aqueous ions by element

External links

Cations